The Blast Furnace Blues Festival is a blues music festival held annually in Bethlehem, Pennsylvania. The Blast Furnace Blues Festival was founded to showcase  contemporary and traditional blues, acoustic and electric blues, soul, zydeco and gospel music. Performers have included national recording artists as well as local and regional performers. 

The festival began in 2011.

See also

List of blues festivals
List of folk festivals

External links
Official website

References

2011 establishments in Pennsylvania
Annual events in Pennsylvania
Bethlehem, Pennsylvania
Blues festivals in the United States
Folk festivals in the United States
Music festivals established in 2011
Music festivals in Pennsylvania
Tourist attractions in Northampton County, Pennsylvania